Remindstate is the remixed version of Mindstate, the debut album by Dutch hip hop duo Pete Philly and Perquisite. The album was released on January 13, 2006 on Epitaph.

Track listing

Chart

References

2006 albums
Pete Philly and Perquisite albums